Researches on Manchu Origins, also known as  Manzhou Yuanliu Kao, is an important history book published by the Qing dynasty government in 1777. The Qianlong Emperor sponsored its compilation with the goal of legitimizing Qing rule, as well as identifying the Qing as a successor to the Jin dynasty (1115–1234). The Manzhou Yuanliu Kao also bolstered Qianlong's conception of the Manchu people as a wu, or martial race.

It consists of 4 parts: Manchu tribes, territory, topography (mountains and rivers), and culture. Pamela Kyle Crossley analyses it as the apex of the Qing dynasty's attempt at "documentary institutionalisation" of Manchu heritage and from it, Manchu ethnic identity. Researches on Manchu Origins contained a list of corrections of transcribed Jurchen language words found in the History of Jin in Chapter 135, using the Manchu language to correct them, in Chapter 18.

Contents
Manzhou Yuanliu Kao was compiled from the perspective of the Manchu ruling class, breaking away from the historical record of librarians by the Han-centric view. It is a document that shows the ethnicity that they have had since ancient times, from the Jurchen tribes to the Manchu tribes. The lineages of Jurchens and Manchus are continued in Buyeo, Goryeo, Samhan, Baekje, Silla, Sushen, Balhae, and Jurchen by era.

References

External links
 Full text on WikiSource

18th-century history books
History of Manchu
Manchu culture
Manchu literature
Qing dynasty literature
Qianlong Emperor
Manchu studies